Ulrich Schmidt (born 1957), known as The Holiday Killer, is a German serial killer and rapist who murdered nine women in Essen, Germany, between 1987 and 1989. He also sexually assaulted four other women, most of whom were critically injured as a result. After he left his camera containing photos of him and his victims at the crime scene of his final attack, he was arrested in 1989, and sentenced to life imprisonment in 1991. Schmidt's moniker was derived from the fact that some of his crimes were committed on public holidays.

Early life 
Little is known about Schmidt's childhood. However, he came from a broken family and had been admitted to different homes from an early age. He also ran away several times.

Crimes 
The first known crime occurred in Essen-Stadtwald on the night of May 14, 1987, when Schmidt attacked a 49-year-old woman on the stairs to the S-Bahn platform. Schmidt put his arm around her neck from behind and demanded money at knifepoint. While the woman was searching through her purse, he cut her neck and pushed her down the remaining steps of the platform. Later, the victim was discovered by passers-by, who found help. The woman survived her injuries after undergoing an emergency surgery.

Schmidt struck again on May 27, one day before Ascension Day. At 11 p.m., Schmidt attempted to rape a 46-year-old pool attendant at the Oase leisure pool at an S-Bahn station in Essen-Frohnhausen. Police arrived at the scene after an emergency call from a passenger who heard the victim screaming. Authorities found the naked corpse of the woman on a meadow below the platform. She had been stabbed 48 times with a screwdriver.

On June 8, 1987, Whit Monday, a 59-year-old woman was attacked by Schmidt at a restroom in Grugapark. Schmidt forced the woman into a stall, where he demanded her woman at knifepoint. While trying to tie the victim up, the woman fought back. After a scuffle, Schmidt beat the woman unconscious, bound her hands and legs, and cut her neck, severing her trachea and esophagus. The woman freed herself after regaining consciousness and reached an ambulance station, from where she was immediately transported to the hospital and survived.

On July 5, 1987, Schmidt murdered a 63-year-old woman who was on her way home between Essen-Kray S-Bahn station and her apartment in Essen-Huttrop. He put his arm around her neck and again demanded money at knifepoint, to which the victim immediately handed over to him. When Schmidt started to tie the woman up, she began to call for help, causing him to stab her several times with the knife and flee. The woman was found a short time later by bystanders and taken to hospital, but died there almost three weeks later from injuries to the liver, pancreas, stomach, and spleen.

On the early morning of March 15, 1989, Schmidt broke into a house of Elisabeth Fey, 81, in Essen-Holsterhausen, gaining entry by breaking a window. After hitting her several times with a blunt weapon, Schmidt stabbed her to death with a kitchen knife he found in the apartment. He then ransacked the apartment before fleeing the scene. The woman's body was found four hours later by her daughter.

The next murder occurred on Maundy Thursday, March 24, 1989, in the Essen-Margarethenhöhe district. A 19-year-old woman on her way home from the Grugabad metro station was assaulted, bound, stabbed twice in the heart, and then dumped behind a garage complex, where her corpse was discovered by her father. Her body was fully clothed, and no money had been stolen from her.

On June 6, 1989, the Schmidt murdered Petra Kleinschmidt, a 23-year-old hall supervisor in an amusement arcade of Essen-Altendorf. Although the young woman was still able to press the alarm button, she bled out from two throat cuts before the police arrived. The victim had been partially undressed.

On June 19, 1989, Schmidt attacked a 41-year-old woman in a parking garage in downtown Essen. As the woman walked to her car, Schmidt wrapped his arm around her neck and demanded money. After receiving the money, he tied up the woman, undressed her, raped her, and stabbed her twice in the throat. After Schmidt left, the victim was able to reach a porters' lodge, where she was rescued.

The last attack happened on August 5, 1989, when Schmidt attempted to rape a 38-year-old geriatric nurse at her apartment in Essen-Rüttenscheid. After the victim called for help, the victim's neighbor rushed to help, causing Schmidt to flee. However, he left his camera, which contained photos of him, his wife, and his victims.

Arrest and conviction 
On August 8, 1989, Ulrich Schmidt was arrested near his mother's apartment in Essen. Due to advice from his lawyer, he refused to testify. In the meantime, during a search of his apartment, combat boots matching the shoe prints found at the apartment of Hlisabeth Fey were discovered. In four other cases, a connection between the victim and Schmidt could also be established by comparing scent traces. In the controversial procedure, specially trained dogs from the Schloss Holte-Stukenbrock police dog school sniffed out the smell of the Schmidt on objects belonging to the victims.

It was also determined that Schmidt often stayed overnight at his brother's workshop, which was located near one of the crime scenes. One of his jackets was found there.The fibers of Schmidt's matched the fibers found at the crime scene of the first murder. Schmidt also confessed to two fellow inmates while he was in custody. He was eventually found guilty of  five murders, three attempted murders, five rapes, one attempted rape, one robbery, and two burglaries.

After nearly two years in custody and 19 days on trial, he allowed his lawyer to tell the court that he no longer disputed the allegations of the prosecution. However, he did not want to speak publicly about his actions and motives, but to instead confide in a psychiatrist. After 43 days of sittings and almost a year of proceedings, Ulrich Schmidt was sentenced to life imprisonment in September 1992.

References 

1957 births
Living people
German serial killers
German rapists
Prisoners sentenced to life imprisonment by Germany
People convicted of murder by Germany
German robbers
People convicted of burglary
German people convicted of murder
20th-century German criminals
German male criminals